Lepidochrysops dollmani is a butterfly in the family Lycaenidae. It is found in south-western and western Tanzania, northern Zambia and possibly Malawi. The habitat consists of Brachystegia woodland.

Both sexes feed from the flowers of herbaceous plants. Adults have been recorded in November and December.

References

Butterflies described in 1923
Lepidochrysops